The Mitsubishi Colt F2000 was an open-wheel formula race car, designed, developed and built by Japanese manufacturer Mitsubishi Motors, for the Japanese Formula 2000 championship, in 1971.

References

Super Formula cars
Open wheel racing cars